52nd New York Film Critics Circle Awards
January 25, 1987

Best Picture: 
Hannah and Her Sisters

The 52nd New York Film Critics Circle Awards honored the best filmmaking of 1986. The winners were announced on 15 December 1986 and the awards were given on 25 January 1987.

Winners 
Best Actor
Bob Hoskins: Mona Lisa
2. Paul Newman: The Color of Money
3. Jeff Goldblum: The Fly

Best Actress
Sissy Spacek: Crimes of the Heart
2. Kathleen Turner: Peggy Sue Got Married
3. Chloe Webb: Sid and Nancy

Best Cinematography
Tony Pierce-Roberts: A Room with a View
2. Frederick Elmes: Blue Velvet
3. Chris Menges: The Mission

Best Director
Woody Allen: Hannah and Her Sisters
2. Oliver Stone: Platoon and Salvador
3. David Lynch: Blue Velvet

Best Documentary
Marlene
2. Sherman's March
3. Partisans of Vilna

Best Film
Hannah and Her Sisters
2. Platoon
3. Blue Velvet

Best Foreign Language Film
The Decline of the American Empire
2. Men...
3. 'Round Midnight
4. Vagabond

Best Screenplay
Hanif Kureishi: My Beautiful Laundrette
2. Woody Allen: Hannah and Her Sisters
3. Ruth Prawer Jhabvala: A Room with a View

Best Supporting Actor
Daniel Day-Lewis: My Beautiful Laundrette & A Room with a View
2. Andy Garcia: 8 Million Ways to Die
3. Ray Liotta: Something Wild

Best Supporting Actress
Dianne Wiest: Hannah and Her Sisters
2. Cathy Tyson: Mona Lisa
3. Mary Elizabeth Mastrantonio: The Color of Money

References

External links 
1986 Awards

1986
New York Film Critics Circle Awards, 1986
New York Film Critics Circle Awards
New York Film Critics Circle Awards
New York Film Critics Circle Awards
New York Film Critics Circle Awards